This is a list of bridges and other crossings of the Schuylkill River, from the Delaware River upstream to the source.  All locations are in Pennsylvania.

Crossings

See also

References

Schuylkill River
Schuylkill

Schuylkill